Rugby sevens competitions at the 2022 South American Games in Asuncion, Paraguay were held between 7 and 9 October 2022 at the Estadio Héroes de Curupayty located within the Parque Olímpico cluster in Luque, a sub-venue outside Asunción.

Two medal events were scheduled to be contested: a men's and women's tournament. A total of 192 athletes (84 athletes–7 teams for men and 108 athletes–9 teams for women) competed in the events. Both tournaments were open competitions, however, players must be at least 17 years old at the start of the tournament.

The top two teams in each tournament (excluding Chile (in both tournaments) and Brazil (in the women's tournament)) qualified for the 2023 Pan American Games rugby sevens competitions, plus Chile which qualified automatically as the 2023 Pan American Games hosts.

Chile and Brazil were the defending champions of the South American Games men's and women's rugby sevens events. Chile had won the men's tournament in the Cochabamba 2018 edition while Brazil had won all previous women's tournament.

Argentina and Brazil won the gold medal in the men's and women's events respectively.

Participating nations
A total of 9 ODESUR nations registered teams for the rugby sevens events. Each nation was able to enter a maximum of 24 athletes (one team of 12 players per gender). Bolivia and Venezuela competed in the women's event while the other seven nations competed in both events.

Schedule
The competition schedule is as follows:

Medal summary

Medal table

Medalists

Men's tournament

Preliminary round

Final stage

Final standings

Women's tournament

Preliminary round

Group 1

Group 2

Group 3

Cup & Challenge stage

Cup group 1

Cup group 2

Challenge group

Final stage

Final standings

References

External links
 ASU2022 Rugby at ASU2022 official website.
 ASU2022 Rugby Teams Male.
 ASU2022 Rugby Teams Female.

Rugby sevens
Rugby sevens at the 2022 South American Games
South American Games
2022